Dishevelled binding antagonist of beta catenin 2 is a protein that in humans is encoded by the DACT2 gene.

References

Further reading